Joseph William Arnison (27 June 1924 – 1996) was a South African professional footballer, best known as a player for Scottish club Rangers and English club Luton Town.

Playing career

Arnison was signed by Glasgow club Rangers for the first post-war season, 1946–47, initially playing in the wartime Victory Cup and Southern League Cup. He scored four goals in ten games for Rangers, an impressive return, but the next season saw him isolated at Ibrox. 1948 saw him move south, when English Second Division side Luton Town offered Rangers £8,000 for his services. Arnison soon became a crowd favourite at Kenilworth Road, scoring a hat-trick in his fourth game as Luton beat Cardiff City 3–0. He finished the season as top scorer, even though he missed a large part of the season with an injury to his right knee.

After three major operations, Arnison retired from the professional game at 27 and returned to South Africa, where he became a physiotherapist.

References

1924 births
1996 deaths
Sportspeople from Johannesburg
South African expatriate soccer players
South African soccer players
Scottish Football League players
English Football League players
Rangers F.C. players
Luton Town F.C. players
Berea Park F.C. players
Expatriate footballers in England
Expatriate footballers in Scotland
White South African people
Association football forwards